José de Anchieta Fontana (31 December 1940 in Santa Teresa, Espírito Santo – 9 September 1980 in Santa Teresa), known as just Fontana was a Brazilian footballer.

During his club career he played for:
 1958 Vitoria
 1959–1962 Rio Branco
 1962–1968 Vasco da Gama
 1969–1972 Cruzeiro

Fontana was a defender of the Brazil national football team when they won the 1970 FIFA World Cup.

He died in his hometown Santa Teresa a few months short of his 40th birthday.

References

External links
 

1940 births
1980 deaths
Brazilian footballers
1970 FIFA World Cup players
FIFA World Cup-winning players
Brazil international footballers
CR Vasco da Gama players
Cruzeiro Esporte Clube players
Association football defenders